This is a list of notable students, professors, alumni and honorary degree recipients of the University of Santo Tomas in Manila. The following Thomasians were distinguished in various fields such as public service, religion, literary arts, commerce, medicine, among others. The list includes people who have studied at various levels in the university, from elementary up to postgraduate school.

National heroes

Religion

Saints and martyrs

Clergymen

Government

Presidents of the Philippines

Vice Presidents of the Philippines

Prime Minister of Spain

Chief Justices

Law, governance, and politics

Military & Law Enforcement Services

Arts, literature, and humanities

National Artists

Literary and visual arts

Film and Television

Science, technology, and medicine

National Scientist

Businesspeople

Sportspeople

The Royal and Pontifical University of Santo Tomas holds the most number of general championships in the University Athletic Association of the Philippines, 39 senior championships titles in 65 seasons. With a formidable athletic program in different sporting events, the university also takes part in various sports leagues such as Filoil Flying V League, Home and Away Invitational League, Collegiate Champion's League, Shakey's V-League and UNIgames; and it continues to produce top-caliber and world-class athletes for the RP National Team.

Basketball

Glowing Goldies era

1990s (4-peat era)

2000s

Volleyball

Taekwondo

Other sports

Academe

The UST Rectors

Administrators and faculty members

Noted honorary Thomasians
Through the years, the University of Santo Tomas has conferred the title of Doctor "honoris causa" (honorary degree) upon exemplary men and women who have contributed to the development of Philippine society through a distinct mark of excellence and leadership in their own fields of endeavor.

See also 
 :Category:University of Santo Tomas alumni

References

External links

 
 Office for Alumni Relations
 Public and Alumni Affairs Office

 
Alumni
Lists of people by university or college in Manila
Lists of alumni by university or college in the Philippines